The Bradford West by-election was a by-election in the House of Commons constituency of Bradford West, which was held on Thursday 29 March 2012. The writ for the by-election was moved and accepted on 6 March 2012.

It was unexpectedly won by George Galloway of the Respect Party who defeated the Labour Party candidate by a large margin in a result referred to by Galloway as the "Bradford Spring" (by analogy with the Arab Spring). Galloway said the election result was Bradford's "peaceful democratic uprising" version of the riots which swept through England in August 2011.

The result was such a surprise as to cause the Joseph Rowntree Reform Trust to commission a report to study the campaign.

Background

Constituency 
Bradford West covers the western areas of City of Bradford. Suburbs include Clayton, Heaton, Manningham, Toller, Thornton and Allerton.

Trigger 
On 29 February 2012, the incumbent Member of Parliament for Bradford West, Marsha Singh, announced his intention to resign due to "serious illness". (He died four months later.) His most recent contribution in the House of Commons came in October 2009. As MPs cannot officially resign from the House of Commons, Singh was appointed to the role of Steward and Bailiff of the Three Hundreds of Chiltern by the Chancellor of the Exchequer, thus disqualifying him from the House.

On 6 March 2012, a motion to issue the writ for the by-election was successfully moved by Shadow Chief Whip Rosie Winterton, setting polling day as 29 March. Nominations closed at 4 pm on Wednesday 14 March.

Candidates
The Statement of Persons Nominated was released by the City of Bradford Council on 15 March.

Former MP George Galloway confirmed on 6 March that he would stand on behalf of the Respect Party, and later that day UK Independence Party leader Nigel Farage announced that their candidate was Sonja McNally, a former Green Party council candidate. On 8 March, the Liberal Democrats chose Bradford City councillor Jeanette Sunderland to be their candidate, and the Conservatives chose businesswoman and former Rotherham 2010 general election candidate Jackie Whiteley. Labour chose Imran Hussain, the Deputy Leader of Bradford City Council, to be its candidate on 11 March.

On 9 March, the Green Party announced that their candidate would be Dawud Islam, a former Labour councillor and former Green local election candidate. The candidate for the Official Monster Raving Loony Party, Alan Hope, has contested seats on fourteen occasions, parliamentary elections and by-elections. Hope used the ballot paper description "Monster Raving Loony William Hill Party" as part of a sponsorship deal. A meeting of the Democratic Nationalists held in Burnley confirmed that Neil Craig was standing for the party as he had done at the 2010 general election.

Results

Galloway's election as MP was the first occasion that the main opposition party has lost a seat in a by-election since the May 2000 Romsey by-election (when the Conservatives lost to the Liberal Democrats). It was also among the largest swings against the incumbent party in the same time period. Respect's increase in its share of the vote, 52.8%, was also among the largest in the history of mainland British parliamentary by-elections since the introduction of universal suffrage.

Campaign
Hussain, the Labour candidate, declared that he would not attend any of the hustings with other candidates, concentrating instead on meeting the electorate. Several senior Labour politicians, including Ed Miliband, Dennis Skinner, Yvette Cooper and Ed Balls, visited the constituency to support his campaign.

Galloway's campaign sought to capitalise on discontent with the local Labour Party and tension in the Asian community. He criticised the claimed role of baradari, an Urdu word literally meaning "brotherhood" that denotes a hierarchical system of clan politics, in corrupting the area's local politics, particularly the local Labour Party. He said that baradari was responsible for "second- and third-rate politicians particularly but not exclusively from the Labour Party being elected to the city council on the basis not of ability, not of ideas, not on records of experience but on whether their father came from the same village as someone else's father 50 or 60 years ago". Naweed Hussain, a campaign manager for the former Labour MP Singh over the previous three general elections, defected and became a campaign manager for Galloway, complaining that Labour had been "bypassing democracy" in the seat. Imran Hussain dismissed claims of baradari.

The Times correspondent Michael Savage noticed that Galloway referred "heavily to his quasi-Islamic values in his campaign literature.  One leaflet proclaimed that 'God KNOWS who is a Muslim and he KNOWS who is not.  I, George Galloway, do not drink and never have." Galloway initially said that the photocopied leaflet in question, which did not, as electoral law requires, include the Respect logo, agent's name or address, had not been produced by him. He made similar comments in his campaign rally, saying, "I'm a better Pakistani than he [Mr Hussain] will ever be. God knows who's a Muslim and who is not. And a man that's never out of the pub shouldn't be going around telling people you should vote for him because he's a Muslim." Galloway's election agent subsequently accepted that the leaflet had Galloway's approval. Decca Aitkenhead, in a Guardian interview published near the end of April 2012, wrote: "Contrary to every report I've read, he doesn't deny writing the leaflet himself". The Muslim Public Affairs Committee (MPACUK), which campaigned for Galloway, were involved in promoting the insinuations against Hussain over his reputed drinking of alcohol.

In an article for The Times, the Labour MP Diane Abbott argued that the result was not one of "identity" politics: "If Muslim voters in Bradford West were going to back someone who shared their ethnic identity, they would have voted for the excellent Labour candidate, who happens to be a local Muslim councillor.  Furthermore, George won heavily in every ward, including many that were not majority Muslims."

Aftermath
Respect stood a total of 12 candidates in the May 2012 local elections in Bradford, although the party had said they would stand candidates in all 30 wards. Five Respect councillors were elected.

The Green by-election candidate Dawud Islam defected to Respect on 3 April 2012.

Past result

See also
 List of United Kingdom by-elections

References

Bradford West by-election
Bradford West by-election
Bradford West by-election
By-elections to the Parliament of the United Kingdom in Bradford constituencies
2010s in West Yorkshire
George Galloway